Romance Is a Bonus Book is a 2019 South Korean television series starring Lee Na-young and Lee Jong-suk. It aired from January 26 to March 17, 2019 on tvN.

Synopsis
Cha Eun-ho is a successful author and a chief editor at a book publishing company. Kang Dan-i is a mother and former successful advertising copywriter. When Cha Eun-ho was a child, Kang Dan-i saved him from an accident and was injured. Kang Dan-i had Cha Eun-ho help her while she was recuperating in hospital and later on bedrest for one year. By helping her acquire books to read from the library, Cha Eun-ho himself became interested in writing. The two youngsters stayed close friends well into adulthood. However, their friendship was strained after Kang Dan-i started dating a selfish, inconsiderate man. Although he disapproved of her choice in a partner, and she too expressed doubt at times, Kang Dan-i stands by her decision to marry this man.

Now in the present, Cha Eun-ho enlists Kang Dan-i to help him find a housekeeper - but he has no idea Kang Dan-i is the one doing the work and taking payment. Her husband has cheated on her, and she is now divorced and unemployed, but he is also unaware of her living situation and the hardships she is facing as a divorced single mother with a large gap in work experience trying to re-enter the professional world. Eventually Kang Dan-i is no longer able to keep her secrets from him, and Cha Eun-ho lends her a helping hand. Their lives become even more intertwined when Kang Dan-i applies to be a temporary task support worker at his publishing company. Although Cha Eun-ho is initially worried about how she will perform, Kang Dan-i surprises him and other senior executives with her creativity and hard work.

The rest of the series is about the personal and professional challenges they face as they slowly start to realize their true feelings for each other and navigate this next stage of their lives.

Cast

Main characters 
 Lee Na-young as Kang Dan-i (37 years old)
A former advertising copywriter and a current unemployed divorcee who later joins the publishing company as a temporary task support team member.
 Lee Jong-suk as Cha Eun-ho (32 years old)
A successful writer who is also the publishing company's youngest editor-in-chief. He is a long-time friend of Kang Dan-i and harbours romantic feelings for her.
 Jung Yoo-jin as Song Hae-rin (29 years old)
The Lead Content Development Editor and trainer of the new recruits, including Kang Dan-i. She has long-standing feelings for Cha Eun-ho, her former trainer, but he does not reciprocate those feelings.
 Wi Ha-joon as Ji Seo-joon (29 years old) 
A freelance book designer the publishing company is looking to hire, who also happened to cross paths with Kang Dan-i and later develops feelings for her. He and Cha Eun-ho have a turbulent relationship related to the conspiracy behind famous author Kang Byeong-jun's retirement and their feelings for Kang Dan-i.

Supporting characters

People at the publishing company
 Kim Tae-woo as CEO Kim Jae-min. He is a bit over-eager, and but an overall well-meaning boss.
 Kim Yoo-mi as Director Go Yoo-sun. She discourages Kang Dan-i's efforts to become a part of the marketing team and keeps her busy with menial tasks around the office.
 Jo Han-chul as Bong Ji-hong. He is married to Seo Young-ah. 
 Kim Sun-young as Seo Young-ah the marketing team manager who is married to Bong Ji-hong.
 Kang Ki-doong as Park Hoon, a talkative and eager-to-please new recruit on the marketing team.
 Park Gyu-young as Oh Ji-yool, a superficial and spoiled new recruit on the editorial team, with an overbearing mother.
 Lee Kwan-hoon as Lee Seung-jin
 Choi Seung-yoon as Bae Kwang-soo
 Lee Ha-eun as Chae Song-ee

Others
 Lee Ji-ha as Hae-rin's mother
 Oh Eui-shik as Hong Dong-min (Kang Dan-i's ex-husband)
 Lee Ji-won as Hong Jae-hee
 Hwang Se-on as Kim Na-kyung
 Noh Jong-hyun as Oh Ji-yool's ex-boyfriend

Production
The first script reading was held on October 26, 2018 with the attendance of the cast and crew.

This series marks Lee Na-young's return to small screen after nine years 

On January 21, 2019, a press conference was held to promote the series with the attendance of lead cast.

Lee Jong-suk finished filming his scenes for the series on February 27, 2019 due to his military service enlistment on March 8.

Original soundtrack

Part 1

Part 2

Part 3

Part 4

Part 5

Part 6

Part 7

Part 8

Viewership

Awards and nominations

Notes

References

External links
  
 
 
 

2019 South Korean television series debuts
2019 South Korean television series endings
TVN (South Korean TV channel) television dramas
Television series produced in Seoul
South Korean romantic comedy television series
Television series by Studio Dragon
Television series by Story & Pictures Media
Korean-language Netflix exclusive international distribution programming